The Association for Business Communication (ABC) is  a  learned society for the field of business communication. The organization is interdisciplinary, with members belonging to academic fields such as management, marketing, English, foreign languages, speech, communication, linguistics, and information systems. Additionally the organization brings together university academicians, business practitioners, and business consultants.

Organizational structure
ABC is an international organization, divided into nine regional divisions (Europe, Asia and Pacific Rim, Caribbean and Central America, and five North American regions: Canada plus Eastern, Midwest, Southeast, Southwest, and Western United States), each with its own separate academic conferences. Each year, the association holds an International Conference in October or November. Midyear, regional conferences are held—one in the European region and one or two of the North American regions. The Asia and Pacific Rim region holds a conference every two years or more frequently.

A board of directors and an executive committee lead the ABC. The board of directors is directly elected with a vice president elected from each of 9 regions and 12 directors at large, with staggered terms. The executive committee consists of a permanent position of executive director and four officers of the association. The members of the executive committee serve for four years in rotating capacity, beginning as second vice president in the first year, then first vice president the next, president the next, and past president the last year on the committee. The organization as a whole elects the second vice president position from among candidates on the board of directors.

The current executive director of the ABC is James M. Dubinsky (Virginia Tech). He took office in 2011.

For 2018-2019 the executive committee consists of President Lisa Gueldenzoph Snyder (North Carolina A & T University), First Vice President Marcel Robles (Eastern Kentucky University), Second Vice President Geert Jacobs (Ghent University), and immediate Past President Deborah Roebuck (Kennesaw State University).

Publications 
Two peer-reviewed academic journals, International Journal of Business Communication and the Business and Professional Communication Quarterly are published by SAGE Publications on behalf of ABC.

History
ABC was founded in 1936, beginning with a modest membership of 72 members, all but one from the United States (the only exception being from Canada). The organization, based at the University of Illinois, was then named the Association of College Teachers of Business Writers. The next year, 1937, that name changed to the American Business Writing Association.

By the 1960s, the field had grown considerably and became heavily interested in areas well beyond business writing (such as oral presentations, negotiations, and nonverbal communication among others). In 1967, the Board of Directors voted to change the name of the organization to the American Business Communication Association to reflect this change.

By the late 1970s, as the membership of the organization grew to include more members from outside the Americas and as the focus of research expanded heavily into the fields of intercultural communication and cross-cultural business communication practice, the term "American" became increasingly inaccurate of both the membership and focus of the organization. In 1985, the Board of Directors voted to change the name to its current Association for Business Communication.

In 1990, ABC moved its headquarters from Illinois first to the University of North Texas (1990–1994) and then to Baruch College CUNY in New York City (from 1994–2007). Presently, ABC is headquartered at Stephen F. Austin State University in Nacogdoches, Texas.

External links
Association for Business Communication
New Zealand Business Forum Communication

Business education
International business organizations
Management education
Organizations established in 1936
Business and management journals
Communications and media organizations based in the United States
Organizations based in Texas